Rocky Boy, Montana may refer to:
 Rocky Boy West, Montana, in Hill and Choteau Counties
 Rocky Boy's Agency, Montana, in Hill County 
 Rocky Boy Indian Reservation, in Hill and Choteau Counties